An anti-romance, sometimes referred to as a satire, is a type of story characterized by having an apathetic or self-doubting anti-hero cast as the protagonist, who fails in the object of his journey or struggle. Most anti-romances take place in urban or fantasy settings, and frequently feature insanity, depression, and the meaning of reality as major themes. An anti-romance is the antithesis of a romance. One of the examples is J. D. Salinger's The Catcher in the Rye is probably the most famous and successful anti-romance, though there are many others, including Thomas Pynchon's The Crying of Lot 49, "Araby" by James Joyce and Joseph Heller's Catch-22. Tsukiyo's Redo of Healer is an anime and manga franchise that also considered a dark fantasy anti-romance.

Another term of anti-romance is considered a genre that specifically refers to lack of romance or intimate relationship, which definitely a "platonic friendship" is not 100% romantic but feel clearly attracted nor friendly-in-communication each other.

References 

Fiction by genre
Narratology
Romance (genre)